Pocollay District is one of ten districts of the province Tacna in Peru.

References